Svans may refer to:
Svans, an ethnic subgroup of the Georgians
The Danish name for the Schwansen peninsula in Schleswig-Holstein in Germany.
The large bird is correctly spelled "swan".